Ted Donaldson (August 20, 1933 – March 1, 2023) was an American actor.

Early years
Born in Brooklyn, New York, Donaldson was the son of singer-composer Will Donaldson and Josephine M. Donaldson née Plant. His mother died when he was  months old. His stepmother was radio organist and composer Muriel Pollock. He attended the Professional Children's School in New York City.

Career
Donaldson began his acting career in December 1937 when he appeared in an NBC radio show. In 1941, he played Tiny Tim in a week-long serialized version of Dickens' A Christmas Carol that was presented on Wheatena Playhouse.

As an 8-year-old, Donaldson portrayed Harlan in the Broadway stage production of Life With Father. In 1943, he performed alongside Gregory Peck in the play Sons and Soldiers.

The performance led to a starring role as Arthur "Pinky" Thompson in his first movie, Once Upon a Time (1944), opposite Cary Grant and Janet Blair. Columbia Pictures put him under contract after the film was finished. In 1945, Donaldson was cast in A Tree Grows in Brooklyn, which marked the directorial debut of Elia Kazan.

Donaldson also starred as Danny Mitchell in the 1940s Rusty series of eight films about a German Shepherd dog.

From 1949 to 1954, he played Bud, the son of Robert Young's character in the radio version of Father Knows Best. He was offered the same role on the television version of the series, but turned it down, saying, "I didn't want to be typed. I didn't want to be a 21-year-old playing a 15- or 16-year-old kid. I wanted to do other things." As an adult, he called that "one of the two or three most stupid things I have not done because not only would the salary have been very nice for five years, but the residuals would have also."

At age 19, he had his last credited feature film role as Jerry Fortness in Phone Call from a Stranger (1952).

As an adult, Donaldson worked as an acting teacher and as a bookseller. In his later years, Donaldson gave a number of interviews about his film career.

In January 2023, Donaldson suffered a fall in his Echo Park apartment. He died of complications from the fall on March 1, 2023, at the age of 89.

Filmography

Once Upon a Time (1944) as Arthur "Pinky" Thompson
Mr. Winkle Goes to War (1944) as Barry
A Tree Grows in Brooklyn (1945) as Neeley Nolan
A Guy, a Gal and a Pal (1945)
Adventures of Rusty (1945) as Danny Mitchell
The Return of Rusty (1946)
Personality Kid (1946)
For the Love of Rusty (1947) as Danny Mitchell
The Son of Rusty (1947)
The Red Stallion (1947) as Joel Curtis
My Pal (1947)
Pal's Adventure (1948)
My Dog Rusty (1948)
Rusty Leads the Way (1948)
The Decision of Christopher Blake (1948)
Rusty Saves a Life (1949)
The Green Promise (1949) as Phineas Matthews
Rusty's Birthday (1949)
Phone Call from a Stranger (1952)
Flight Nurse (1953) (uncredited)

References

Sources
 Holmstrom, John (1996). The Moving Picture Boy: An International Encyclopaedia from 1895 to 1995. Norwich: Michael Russell, pp. 184–185.
 Best, Marc (1971). Those Endearing Young Charms: Child Performers of the Screen. South Brunswick and New York: Barnes & Co. pp. 74–79.

External links

1933 births
2023 deaths
20th-century American male actors
Male actors from New York City
American male child actors
American male film actors
American male radio actors
Accidental deaths from falls